Nikolai Vassilievich Ovchinnikov (October 14, 1918 in village of Mizhuli, Cheboksary Uezd – February 2004), was a Russian and Chuvash painter (historical and conversation pieces, landscapes), People's Artist of Russia and Chuvashia, Professor, Member of the National Academy of Sciences and Arts of the Chuvash Republic.

Biography 
He was born in the village of Mizhuli in Mariinsko-Posadsky District of the Chuvash Republic in 1918.

Studied in Alatyr Art School (1937).

During 1939–1945, Ovchinnikov fought in the Soviet-Finnish War on the Karelian Isthmus and World War II.

Since 1944, a member of the USSR Union of Artists.

In 1951 he graduated the Ilya Repin Institute of Arts, Sculpture and Architecture of the USSR Academy of Arts in Leningrad (now St. Petersburg (workshop of Professor R.R. Frenz). A Candidate degree in Art Studies in 1954.

Since 1960, he was an associate professor of the Chair of Arts at the Fine and Graphic Arts Department of the Chuvash State Teacher's Institute named after I.Ya. Yakovlev.

Secretary of the Board of the RSFSR Union of Artists (1961–1983).

Chairman of the Board of the Union of Artists of the Chuvash ASSR (1963–1989).

People's Artist of the Chuvash ASSR (1968).

Professor of Fine Arts Chair (1973).

Full member of the National Academy of Sciences and Arts of the Chuvash Republic (1995).

RSFSR People's Artist (1984).

Exhibitions 
He participated in regional, Ull-Union, All-Russian exhibitions and in exhibitions abroad.
Personal exhibitions in the US, Japan, France, UK, and Germany.

Gallery 
Paintings by Nikolai Ovchinnikov are in 34 museums in Russia and abroad, and in private collections.

Awards 
 He was awarded with the Order of the Patriotic War (2nd degree) and the Order of Friendship of Peoples (1978)
 He was awarded the State Prize of the Chuvash Republic named after K. V. Ivanov (1975)
 His name was entered into the Honorary Book of Labour Fame and Heroism of the Chuvash Autonomous Republic (1989)
 He was awarded a gold medal of the National Academy of Sciences and Arts of the Chuvash Republic (2002).

References
 Ovchinnikov's brief bio in English
 About Nikolai Ovchinnikov in Russian
 Ovchnnikov's paintings in the Chuvash State Museum of Fine Arts in Russian
 About Ovchinnikov's paintings in Russian

1918 births
2004 deaths
People from Mariinsko-Posadsky District
20th-century Russian painters
Russian male painters
21st-century Russian painters
Soviet painters
Repin Institute of Arts alumni
Chuvash people
20th-century Russian male artists
21st-century Russian male artists